Žitnjak may refer to:
 a neighborhood in Zagreb, Croatia, part of the Peščenica – Žitnjak district
 Miroslav Žitnjak, a Croatian footballer